Capital punishment is legal in most countries of the Middle East. Much of the motivation for the retention of the death penalty has been religious in nature, as the Qur'an allows or mandates executions for various offences.

Moratoria and abolition

Israel 
Almost all death penalties were abolished by legislation in 1954 except for serious crimes committed during wartime. The last execution to ever take place in Israel was that of Adolf Eichmann, who was convicted for his role in the Holocaust, in 1962.

A moratorium has since been placed on all further execution of any individual.

Legal formalities aside, popular sentiment in favor of the death penalty occasionally rises in Israel in response to particularly heinous crimes. After the Sbarro suicide bombing, right-wing newspapers called for the perpetrators to be executed but Ahlmam Tamimi was only sentenced to prison.

In January 2018, Knesset made a preliminary vote on a bill introducing death penalty for terrorism.

Turkey
In Turkey, capital punishment was fully abolished in 2004 for all crimes.

In 2018, Recep Tayyip Erdoğan and his right-wing government coalition partners agreed to a proposal that could see the death penalty restored in Turkey against anyone sentenced for terrorism.

Abolition advocacy

Attempts
In Lebanon in 2008, then-Justice Minister Ibrahim Najjar introduced a draft law to Parliament which would abolish the death penalty. While the law failed to pass, he continued to advocate for the abolition for the rest of his time in office.

Farouk Ksentini, chairman of Algeria's National Advisory Commission for the Protection and Promotion of Human Rights (CNCPPDH), stated in 2010 that he would advocate for the abolition of the death penalty. This aroused opposition from Islamist groups.

Places with the death penalty. 
The following, groups, nations, or governments currently enforce the death penalty :

 Libya
 Egypt
 Iraq
 Iraqi Kurdistan
 Kingdom of Saudi Arabia
 Syria
 Gaza 
 Palestinian Authority
 Lebanon
 Jordan
 Iran
 Qatar
 United Arab Emirates
 Yemen (Hadi and Houthi governments)
 Sultanate of Oman

References

External links
 Death sentences and executions in the Middle East and North Africa in 2009 – by Amnesty International

Capital punishment